Antonín Dvořák's Andante appassionato for string quartet in F major B.40a is a section of music taken from the original version of his string quartet B.40, No. 6. With minimal editing, the Andante appassionato forms a standalone piece.

Background 
During November and December 1873, the original version of the string quartet No. 6, B.40, was composed. The quartet was initially fashioned in one continuous piece. On revising it, probably in 1874, Dvořák began to split the music into the conventional four movements, and set the Andante appassionato portion aside as a separate item. The last bar of the piece would originally have led into the next section of the complete quartet, and as such, according to Jarmil Burghauser, it would have modulated in key. Instead of this, for the single movement piece, Burghauser provided a suggested F major conclusion with a lengthened tonic note. This is the version recorded by the Prager Streichquartett for the Deutsche Grammophon complete set of Dvořák's string quartet works. See CD notes.

The piece has been described as "somewhat reminiscent of Schubertian Romanticism".

Position in the original string quartet
The piece starts in A minor and ends on a chord of F major. The start and end keys thus give it a potential place in Dvořák's String Quartet number 6 between movements 1 (which ends in A major) & 2 (which starts in F major). Some of the writing of the Andante appassionato is reminiscent of the start of the second movement of the quartet number 6, which makes the sequence 'Movement 1-Andante appassionato- Movement 2' credible in the current completed forms of the pieces. Note, however, that Burghauser describes it as originally 'leading to the [fourth movement] finale'.

Notes

References

Sources

External links 
 English language version of page about Dvořák's Andante appassionato for String Quartet B.40a at a Czech site

String quartets by Antonín Dvořák
1873 compositions
Compositions in F major